Adam Hadwin (born 2 November 1987) is a Canadian professional golfer who plays on the PGA Tour. He has won once on the PGA Tour, twice on the Web.com Tour, and twice on the Canadian Tour.

Early life
Hadwin was born in Moose Jaw, Saskatchewan and lives in Abbotsford, British Columbia. He grew up playing golf at the Ledgeview Golf Club there; one clubmate was another top young player, Nick Taylor. In his early teens, Hadwin moved to Ontario and attended Vaughan Secondary School. His father Gerry is a golf club professional who joined the Canadian PGA in 1979. Hadwin was a member of the RCGA's 2008 Canadian men's amateur team. He attended the University of Louisville on golf scholarship, studying business, and earned All-America Honorable Mention for 2009.

Professional career

2009
Hadwin turned professional shortly after leaving college. His first professional win came at the Ledgeview Open on the Vancouver Golf Tour (VGT). He went on to win a total of four VGT events in 2009, including the Golden Ear's Open, the Johnston Meier Insurance Open and the RBC Invitational Pro-am, asserting himself against the top professionals in Western Canada. Hadwin won a 2009 Gateway Tour Winter Series Sponsorship event.

2010
Hadwin joined the Canadian Tour in 2010, earning exempt status in the 2010 California Winter Qualifying School. He won the Rivermead Cup as the top Canadian finisher in the 2010 RBC Canadian Open at St. George's Golf and Country Club in Toronto. This was his first PGA Tour event, and he finished at 5-under-par 279, good for a tie for 37th place. Hadwin played in the 2010 Ford Wayne Gretzky Classic, a Nationwide Tour event, finishing in a tie for 33rd place. Hadwin returned home in September and won the Vancouver Golf Tour's Vancouver City Open with a score of 204 (−10). Hadwin won the Canadian Tour's 2010 Desert Dunes Classic in the Palm Springs area, in November. He had six top-10 finishes on the Canadian Tour in 2010, and was the circuit's Canadian Rookie of the Year.

2011
Hadwin spent time during the winter of 2010–11 playing on the South African Sunshine Tour. He won a second Canadian Tour event in March 2011, the Pacific Colombia Tour Championship, in Bogota, Colombia, taking home US$23,400 for scoring 66-66-62-69 to win by six strokes. Hadwin finished as the top Canadian, and tied for 39th place, in the 2011 U.S. Open at Congressional Country Club near Washington, D.C.. He won $41,154. This was his first major championship. In the 2011 RBC Canadian Open at the Shaughnessy Golf & Country Club in Vancouver, Hadwin entered the final round in second place, one stroke out of the lead, following rounds of 72-66-68. Hadwin shot 72 in the final round, finished in a tie for fourth place, won $228,800 for the biggest prize of his career, and captured the Rivermead Cup for the second straight year. His position in the Official World Golf Rankings advanced from 332 to a career high of 214. By finishing in the top-10 of the RBC Canadian Open, Hadwin earned a place in the next Tour event, the Greenbrier Classic, and continued his good play there with rounds of 70-71-68-68, good for a tie for 32nd place, winning $32,485.71. He won the 2011 Vancouver Open on the Vancouver Golf Tour, scoring 65-65-73 and then winning a playoff over Brad Clapp. He was given a sponsor's exemption into the 2011 Fry's.com Open where he took home $130,312 for a T-7th finish after shooting rounds of 71-68-64-70. Hadwin attempted to qualify for the PGA Tour through Q School. He finished tied for 100th.

2012
Hadwin earned conditional Nationwide Tour status for 2012 based on his Q school finish. After a slow start to the year, he had a T-5 finish at the Soboba Golf Classic in April. After only making four of his next eight cuts, he finished with 63–66 over the weekend of the Cox Classic in August to secure a T-3 finish. Overall, for the year, he made 13 of 25 cuts, with four top-10 finishes with two third-place finishes, but only finished 30th on the money list, not earning a PGA Tour card.

2013
Hadwin is playing a full season on the Web.com Tour based on his 2012 season.

2014
On 9 March 2014, Hadwin won his first career Web.com Tour event at the Chile Classic. The win earned him US$117,000 and moved him to first place on the money list. He became the 13th Canadian to win on the Web.com Tour. On 7 September 2014, Hadwin won for a second time on the Web.com Tour, when he took home a playoff win at the Chiquita Classic. Hadwin earned his PGA Tour card for the 2014–15 season by topping the combined regular season and Web.com Tour Finals money list.

2017
On 21 January 2017, Hadwin shot a 59 (−13) in the third round of the CareerBuilder Challenge at La Quinta Country Club in La Quinta, California. He finished as the runner-up, and was the last player (as of the end of 2018) to shoot a round of 13-under, which is regarded as the lowest score in relation to par on the PGA Tour. On 12 March 2017, Hadwin won his first career PGA Tour tournament at the Valspar Championship, earning a prize of $1,134,000. At the end of the season, Hadwin played in the 2017 Presidents Cup.

2018
Hadwin had three top-10 finishes at the start of the year: T-3 at the CareerBuilder Challenge, T-6 at the Genesis Open, and T-9 at the WGC-Mexico Championship.

2019
In December 2019, Hadwin played on the International team at the 2019 Presidents Cup at Royal Melbourne Golf Club in Australia. The U.S. team won 16–14. Hadwin went 1–1–1 including a half in his Sunday singles match against Bryson DeChambeau.

2022
In June 2022, Hadwin led the U.S. Open after the first round and finished T-7.

Professional wins (12)

PGA Tour wins (1)

Web.com Tour wins (2)

Canadian Tour wins (2)

1Co-sanctioned by the Tour de las Américas

Vancouver Golf Tour wins (6)
2009 Ledgeview Open, Golden Ear's Open, Johnston Meier Insurance Open, RBC Invitational Pro-am
2010 Vancouver City Open
2011 Vancouver City Open

Gateway Tour wins (1)
2009 Desert Winter Sponsorship Event

Results in major championships
Results not in chronological order in 2020.

CUT = missed the half-way cut
"T" = tied
NT = No tournament due to COVID-19 pandemic

Summary

Most consecutive cuts made – 4 (2019 PGA – 2020 U.S. Open)
Longest streak of top-10s – 1 (once, current)

Results in The Players Championship

CUT = missed the halfway cut
"T" indicates a tie for a place
C = Canceled after the first round due to the COVID-19 pandemic

Results in World Golf Championships

1Cancelled due to COVID-19 pandemic

NT = No tournament
"T" = Tied

PGA Tour career summary

* As of the 2020 season

Team appearances
Professional
World Cup (representing Canada): 2016, 2018
Presidents Cup (representing the International team): 2017, 2019

See also
2014 Web.com Tour Finals graduates
Lowest rounds of golf

References

External links

Adam Hadwin articles from Canadian Golfer

Canadian male golfers
Louisville Cardinals men's golfers
PGA Tour golfers
Korn Ferry Tour graduates
Golfing people from Saskatchewan
Golfing people from British Columbia
Sportspeople from Moose Jaw
Sportspeople from Abbotsford, British Columbia
1987 births
Living people